South of the Equator is a 1924 American silent comedy adventure film directed by William James Craft and starring Kenneth MacDonald, Virginia Warwick and Gino Corrado.

Synopsis
The daughter of the democratically elected president of a South American country travels to America in order to secure arms supplies to resist an insurgency in her native country. In New York henchman of the revolutionary movement attempt to thwart her mission, but she is rescued by a young America John Dunlap. He then travels back with her to South America.

Cast
 Kenneth MacDonald as John Dunlap
 Virginia Warwick as Clara Montavlo
 Gino Corrado as Presidente Montavlo
 Martin Turner as 	The Young Man's Friend
 Alphonse Martell as 	The General's Aide
 Robert Barnes as The Officer

References

Bibliography
 Connelly, Robert B. The Silents: Silent Feature Films, 1910-36, Volume 40, Issue 2. December Press, 1998.
 Munden, Kenneth White. The American Film Institute Catalog of Motion Pictures Produced in the United States, Part 1. University of California Press, 1997.

External links
 

1924 films
1924 comedy films
1924 adventure films
1920s English-language films
American silent feature films
1920s adventure comedy films
American adventure comedy films
Films directed by William James Craft
American black-and-white films
Films set in South America
1920s American films
Silent American comedy films
Silent adventure comedy films